Federico Horacio Laens Martino (born January 14, 1988 in Montevideo) is a Uruguayan footballer who plays as a striker for C.A. Progreso.

Club career

International career
He has been capped by the Uruguay national under-20 football team for the 2007 South American Youth Championship held in Paraguay, where he scored a goal against Argentina.

External links
 
 
 

1988 births
Living people
Footballers from Montevideo
Uruguayan footballers
Association football forwards
Uruguayan expatriate footballers
Club Nacional de Football players
Defensor Sporting players
Montevideo Wanderers F.C. players
Delfino Pescara 1936 players
A.S.G. Nocerina players
Peñarol players
C.A. Bella Vista players
Seongnam FC players
El Tanque Sisley players
Rentistas players
FC Cartagena footballers
La Equidad footballers
Centro Atlético Fénix players
Deportivo Maldonado players
Juventud de Las Piedras players
Deportes Melipilla footballers
C.A. Progreso players
Serie C players
Uruguayan Primera División players
Uruguayan Segunda División players
K League 1 players
Segunda División B players
Categoría Primera A players
Primera B de Chile players
Uruguayan expatriate sportspeople in Chile
Uruguayan expatriate sportspeople in Italy
Uruguayan expatriate sportspeople in Switzerland
Uruguayan expatriate sportspeople in South Korea
Uruguayan expatriate sportspeople in Colombia
Uruguayan expatriate sportspeople in Spain
Expatriate footballers in Chile
Expatriate footballers in Italy
Expatriate footballers in Switzerland
Expatriate footballers in South Korea
Expatriate footballers in Colombia
Expatriate footballers in Spain